USNS Potomac (T-AO-150) was a United States Navy Maumee-class oiler in non-commissioned service with the Military Sea Transportation Service, later Military Sealift Command, from 1957 to 1961.

Potomac, fifth U.S. Navy ship to bear the name, was laid down at Sun Shipbuilding and Drydock Company at Chester, Pennsylvania,
on 9 June 1955 and launched on 8 October 1956, sponsored by Mrs. T. H. Robbins, Jr. She entered non-commissioned U.S. Navy service under the control of the Military Sea Transport Service (MSTS) with a primarily civilian crew on 30 January 1957.

Potomac carried fuel oil and aviation fuel to the United States armed forces overseas until 26 September 1961, when she was wracked by fire and a series of explosions while alongside the Aviation Fuels Terminal Pier at Morehead City, North Carolina. Two men were killed in the explosions, and the forward part of the ship was declared a total loss. A disastrous waterfront fire was avoided by the prompt heroic action of Potomac crew members, United States Coast Guard personnel, and U.S. Marines, who prevented the fire from igniting large fuel storage tanks adjacent to the pier.

The 200-foot (61 m) stern section of the ship was cut away and towed to Newport News Shipbuilding and Drydock Company at Newport News, Virginia, for salvage. A new bow and forebody was constructed at Sun Shipbuilding and Drydock Company in Chester, Pennsylvania and welded there to the salvaged stern section, with the bridge and crew accommodations aft. The reconstructed ship, SS Shenandoah, entered service in 1965 and became USNS Potomac (T-AO-181) in 1976 when purchased by the Military Sealift Command

See also
USNS Potomac (T-AO-181)

References

NavSource Online: Service Ship Photo Archive: USNS Potomac (T-AO-150)

Maumee-class oilers
Cold War auxiliary ships of the United States
Ships built by the Sun Shipbuilding & Drydock Company
1956 ships
Maritime incidents in 1961